The following is a list of the 354 communes of the Sarthe department of France.

The communes cooperate in the following intercommunalities (as of 2020):
CU Le Mans Métropole
Communauté urbaine d'Alençon (partly)
Communauté de communes de la Champagne Conlinoise et du Pays de Sillé
Communauté de communes Le Gesnois Bilurien
Communauté de communes Haute Sarthe Alpes Mancelles
Communauté de communes Loir-Lucé-Bercé
Communauté de communes Loué-Brûlon-Noyen
Communauté de communes Maine Cœur de Sarthe
Communauté de communes Maine Saosnois (partly)
Communauté de communes d'Orée de Bercé - Bélinois
Communauté de communes du Pays Fléchois
Communauté de communes du Pays de l'Huisne Sarthoise
Communauté de communes de Sablé-sur-Sarthe (partly)
Communauté de communes du Sud-Est du Pays Manceau
Communauté de communes Sud Sarthe
Communauté de communes du Val de Sarthe
Communauté de communes des Vallées de la Braye et de l'Anille

References

Sarthe